Norway was represented by three-member girl group Charmed, with the song "My Heart Goes Boom", at the 2000 Eurovision Song Contest, which took place on 13 May in Stockholm. "My Heart Goes Boom" was chosen as the Norwegian entry at the Melodi Grand Prix on 4 March.

Before Eurovision

Melodi Grand Prix 2000 
Melodi Grand Prix 2000 was the Norwegian national final that selected Norway's entry for the Eurovision Song Contest 2000.

Competing entries 
Composers were directly invited by NRK to submit songs for the competition. The composers both created the song and selected the performer for their entry. Among the competing artists, Jan Werner Danielsen represented Norway in the Eurovision Song Contest 1994.

Final 
The final took place on 4 March 2000 at the Studio 1 of NRK, hosted by Hans Christian Andersen and Stine Buer. The winner was selected by a combination of regional televoting and a jury panel in two rounds. In the first round, the top four entries were selected to proceed to the second round, the superfinal. The results of the public televote were revealed by Norway's five regions, with the televoting figures of each region being converted to points. The top ten songs received 1–8, 10 and 12 points. The jury panel had a weighting equal to the votes of two televoting regions. In the superfinal, the top three songs from each televoting region received 8, 10 and 12 points. The jury panel again had a weighting equal to the votes of two televoting regions. "My Heart Goes Boom" performed by Charmed was the winner at the conclusion of the voting. The jury consisted of Gunilla Holm Platou, Kyrre Fritzner, Marte Krogh, Torstein Bieler and Hege Tepstad.

At Eurovision 
On the night of the final Charmed performed 8th in the running order, following Malta and preceding Russia. The trio gave an energetically choreographed performance, although their stage outfits and hair-styling were the subject of a degree of unfavourable comment. At the close of voting "My Heart Goes Boom" had received 57 points, placing Norway 11th of the 24 entries, a rather disappointing finish as top 10 had been expected. The 12 points from the Norwegian televote were awarded to Latvia.

Voting

References 

2000
Countries in the Eurovision Song Contest 2000
2000
Eurovision
Eurovision